Ali Pirouzkhah is a retired Iranian water polo player. He is the former captain of the Iran Water polo national team he retired from the international water polo after winning the bronze medal at the 2018 Asian Games in Jakarta. Currently he is the head coach of the national youth team and is responsible for the talent of the Iranian Water Polo Federation.

Education 

 Master of Sport Management, Islamic Azad University, Tehran Branch, Tehran, Iran
 Bachelor of Physical Education, University of Tehran, Year

Refereeing and coaching 

 Holder of Second and Third degree Water Polo Certificate
 Holder of Waterloo Arbitration Certificate 2nd degree
 Holder of 2nd and 3rd degree Coaching Certificate
 Deep Rescue Certificate Holder

References 

Iranian male water polo players
1988 births
Living people
Asian Games medalists in water polo
Water polo players at the 2018 Asian Games
Asian Games bronze medalists for Iran
Medalists at the 2018 Asian Games
Islamic Solidarity Games competitors for Iran
21st-century Iranian people